Don Ferguson may refer to:

Don Ferguson (actor) (born 1946), Canadian actor and comedian
Don Ferguson (South Australian politician) (1936–2013)
Don Ferguson (Victorian politician) (1907–1987)
Don Ferguson (Canadian politician), Green Party of Canada candidate during the 2004 Canadian federal election
Don Ferguson (rower) (born 1912), Australian rower
Don Ferguson (soccer) (born 1963), Canadian soccer goalkeeper
J. Don Ferguson (1933–2008), sometimes credited as "Don Ferguson", American character actor

See also
Donald Ferguson (disambiguation)
Ferguson (name)